Cala Tarida is a beach resort on the western seaboard of the Spanish island of Ibiza.

Description
Cala Tarida is in a sheltered bay on the west coast. The white sand is fine and clean and has a southerly aspect. The waters are clean and crystal clear over a sandy bottom and are shallow to quite a long way out. To the right hand side of the beach the water is deeper, and there are two satellite beaches, both with fine sand. The left hand side of the cove is also rocky.

References

Beaches of Ibiza
Seaside resorts in Spain
Beaches of the Balearic Islands